Revised Quest for the Seasoned Traveller is a compilation of rare material released by A Tribe Called Quest in 1992.

Track listing
"Bonita Applebum (12-Inch Why Edit)" – 5:33 
"I Left My Wallet in El Segundo (Vampire Mix)" – 5:57
"Description of a Fool (Talkie)" – 3:07
"Pubic Enemy (Saturday Night Virus Discomix)" – 4:19
"Check the Rhime (Mr. Muhammad's Mix)" – 3:40
"Luck of Lucien (Main Mix)" – 7:10
"Can I Kick It? (Extended Boilerhouse Mix)" – 6:40
"Scenario (Young Nation Mix)" – 5:10
"If the Papes Come (Remix)" – 4:18
"Jazz (We've Got) (Re-Recording)" – 4:20
"Butter (Hip Hop Mix)" – 3:58
"Bonita Applebum (Hootie Mix)" – 3:16

References 

A Tribe Called Quest albums
Hip hop compilation albums
Albums produced by Q-Tip (musician)
1992 compilation albums
Jive Records compilation albums